Honorable Maldivian Al-Usthaaz Ibrahim Shihab (1926–1988), was an influential Maldivian writer, poet, essayist and statesman. He was the son of scholar Husain Salaahuddin. Hussain Salaahuddin was a famous Maldivian poet and also served as the Maldivian Chief Justice.
 
Ibrahim Shihab is considered one of the most prolific writers of Maldivian literature at a time named 'Era of Crawling' (Dhivehi: ޅަފަތުގެ ދައުރު, Lhafathuge Dhauru).

Life
He began at Maldivian Government's Service as clerk, Mahkamathul Dhaakhiliyyaa (from 14.1.1942 to 27.4.1951). After that he rose and held various high government posts, on 26 Muharram 1379 (3 August 1959) Ibrahim Shihab was designated of Attorney General and Mahukamathul Irushaadiyya in the cabinet elected by President Ibrahim Nasir.
During his life he held also Ministerial posts, was appointed as one of the Vice Presidents, and became a Member of the Committee set up by the Cabinet to review and amend the Constitution.

He served as the speaker of People's Majlis from 1982 to 1988.

Towards the end of his life he was also named president of the council for linguistic and historical research.

Among his works, the General introduction to the concept of history, Preface to the Dhivehi Tareek is a good sample of his style.

Ibrahim Shihab was loved and respected by Maldivians. At the time of his death the Television Maldives announcer giving the news broke down and cried.

Notes

External links
Siyaasee Oivaru 5:Late Ibrahim Shihab
Hakeem 1948

1926 births
1989 deaths
Maldivian writers
Vice presidents of the Maldives
Speakers of the People's Majlis
Government ministers of the Maldives
Dhivehi people
20th-century Maldivian writers